The 2009 I-League 2nd Division season ran from February 2009 to 19 April 2009. Initially 15 teams were divided in three groups of five teams and then the top two teams in each group were advanced to final round of qualification.

Four teams were promoted to I-league 2010 season. Promoted teams include Pune FC, Lajong SSC, Viva Kerala and Salgaocar.

Group A

Group B

Group C

Final round

References

External links
 I-League 2nd Division (Regular Season) – Soccerway
 I-League 2nd Division (Final Group) – Soccerway

I-League 2nd Division seasons
2
India